Bangladesh Sugar and Food Industries Corporation or BSFIC, is a government owned corporation in Bangladesh that is charge of sugar production. It is under the Ministry of Industries.

History 
Bangladesh Sugar and Food Industries Corporation was established on 1 July 1976. AKM Delwar Hossain is the present chairman of the corporation. Bangladesh Sugar and Food Industries Corporation is in charge of 15 state run sugar mills in Bangladesh. It has been trying to export sugar to Europe. 

Private dealers in 2012, were not taking orders from the Bangladesh Sugar and Food Industries Corporation as it was selling to them at higher price then the market rate. It has lobbied for more tariffs on imports to increase sales and reduce its stockpile of sugar. 

In 2014, the Bangladesh Sugar and Food Industries Corporation started selling sugar at 40 taka per kg which is half the production cost.

Notable companies 
 Carew & Co (Bangladesh) Ltd
 Joypurhat Sugar Mill
 Shyampur Sugar Mills
 Renwick Jajneswar & Co Limited

References

1976 establishments in Bangladesh
Government-owned companies of Bangladesh
Manufacturing companies based in Dhaka
Sugar mills in Bangladesh
Food and drink companies of Bangladesh
Agriculture companies of Bangladesh